Paul Simmons is an American football coach. He is the head football coach at Harding University in Searcy, Arkansas, a position he has held since 2017. He has compiled a record of 50–13, winning a Great American Conference championship in 2021, and reaching the semifinals of the NCAA Division II Football Championship playoffs in 2017.

As a player for Harding, Simmons was a three-time first-team All-American linebacker and defensive end. He was inducted into the Harding Athletics Hall of Fame in 1999. Simmons played high school football for the Ashdown High School Panthers in Ashdown, Arkansas from 1988 to 1990.

Head coaching record

College

References

External links
 Harding profile

Date of birth missing (living people)
Year of birth missing (living people)
Living people
American football defensive ends
American football linebackers
Harding Bisons football coaches
Harding Bisons football players
High school football coaches in Tennessee
People from Little River County, Arkansas
Coaches of American football from Arkansas
Players of American football from Arkansas